Copperfield is a neighbourhood in the southeast quadrant of Calgary, Alberta. The neighbourhood is bounded by 52nd St. to the west, Stoney Trail to the south, and the neighbourhood of New Brighton to the north.

It is represented in the Calgary City Council by the Ward 12 councillor.

Copperfield had a population of 7,162 in 2011.

History
The community of Copperfield was launched in 2002 by Hopewell Residential Communities. Since that time the Copperfield community has grown to include approximately 4000 homes, including 2800 single family homes upon completion in 2006 over a 4-year period.

Demographics 

See also
List of neighbourhoods in Calgary

References

External links
Marquis de Lorne Community Association

Neighbourhoods in Calgary